Onchestus rentzi is an Australian species of stick insect, commonly named the crowned stick insect, described in 2006. It lives in rainforests along the coast of Queensland and the Northern Territory. It is named after the Australian orthopterist David Rentz.

Identification
Crowned stick insects are dark black-grey and use camouflage to blend in with the surroundings. Adults can reach lengths of  120mm and have a protuberance of the cuticle of the head which resembles a crown in both sexes. The wings of this species are a deep purple in colour.

Gallery

See also
List of Australian stick insects and mantids

References

External links
Phasmid Study Group: Onchestus rentzi
Phasmida SpeciesFile: Onchestus rentzi

rentzi
Insects of Australia
Endemic fauna of Australia
Insects described in 2006